The Bukovina District, also known as the Chernivtsi District, was an administrative-territorial unit of the Kingdom of Galicia and Lodomeria within the Habsburg monarchy in Bukovina, annexed from Moldavia. It was first a military district from 1775 to 1786 until it was officially incorporated into Galicia and Lodomeria as its own district.

Geographical location 

The Bukovina district occupied the area between the Carpathians mountains and the Seret, from the middle reaches of the Dniester to about the middle reaches of Moldavia. It was located in the east of the Austrian Empire and in the southeast of the Kingdom of Galicia and Lodomeria.

Western Bukovina was part of the Habsburg monarchy from the second half of 1774 . Until May 1775 as a temporary military administrative-territorial unit - Chernivtsi General. It was join the Kingdom of Galicia and Lodomeria, and the south (districts of Seret and Suceava, and Dovgopol district) to the Kingdom of Hungary.

However, such intentions were strongly opposed by the local population of Dovhopil region (about 90% of the population were ethnic Ruthenians and Poles), which geographically separated the mostly Romanian Suceava from Transylvania, which forced to abandon this idea.

The final decision on the future management of the region was made on August 6, 1786, during the stay in Lviv of Joseph II, who liquidated his Patent The Military Administration of Bukovina (as having fulfilled its mission during the transition period) and annexed the Bukovina District (in full) to the Kingdom of Galicia and Volodymyria as the Chernivtsi District, later renamed the Bukovina District.

Population 
The period of the region's status as a district of the Kingdom of Galicia and Lodomeria is characterized by a significant increase in population, mainly due to immigrants, colonizers and more. The tributary was recorded by both the Romanians from Transylvania and the Ruthenians from Galicia. Germans, Poles, and mostly Jews came from different regions. In 1786, the population of the region was estimated at 91,000 inhabitants.

Prior to that, the population was rewritten exclusively for a religion that blurred the boundaries between Ruthenians (Ukrainians) and Wallachians (Romanians), generalizing them as Orthodox. According to the results of the 1846 census: 180,417 Ruthenians (Ukrainians) were recorded. (48.6%), Wallachians (Romanians) - 140,625 people. (37.9%), other nationalities (mainly Germans, Jews, Poles) - 50089 people. (13.5%). Such results were obtained within the Bukovina district as a whole (northern and southern parts).

Territorial division of the district 
Bukovina district was divided into four counties (until August 1, 1794 – districts) and one separate district:

 Chernivtsi County ( German: Bezirk Czernowitz).
 Vyzhnytsya district
 Seret County
 Suceava County
 Dovhopil district

Each county consisted of 12 districts with 10 communities in each.

In the military organization, Bukovina district was divided into Chernivtsi and Suceava regimental districts, in the fiscal sphere - into eight tax districts.

The administrative center of the Bukovina district was the city of Chernivtsi.

References

Bukovina
Kingdom of Galicia and Lodomeria
1775 establishments in the Habsburg monarchy
States and territories established in 1775
States and territories disestablished in 1849